This is a list of schools in Changping District, Beijing.

Secondary schools
Note: In China the word 中学 zhōngxué, gets translated as "middle school", but actually means secondary school. 初中 chū​zhōng is the real word for middle school.

  Nankou School (北京市第十五中学南口学校)
 Beijing City Changping Vocational School (北京市昌平职业学校) - Main Campus and Nankou Campus (南口校区)
 Beijing City Changping District Baishan School (北京市昌平区百善学校)
 Beijing City Changping District Heishanzhai School  (北京市昌平区黑山寨学校)
 Beijing City Changping District Taowa School  (北京市昌平区桃洼学校)
 Beijing City Changping District Xiazhuang School (北京市昌平区下庄学校)
 Beijing City Changping District No. 1 High School (北京市昌平区第一中学) - Main Campus and Tiantongyuan Campus (天通苑校区)
 Beijing City Changping District No. 2 High School (北京市昌平区第二中学)
 Beijing City Changping District No. 4 High School (北京市昌平区第四中学)
 Beijing City Changping District Cuicun High School (北京市昌平区崔村中学)
 Beijing City Changping District Dadongliu High School (北京市昌平区大东流中学)
 Beijing City Changping District Liucun High School  (北京市昌平区流村中学)
 Beijing City Changping District Nankoutiedaobei High School (北京市昌平区南口铁道北中学)
 Beijing City Changping District Nanshao High School (北京市昌平区南邵中学)
 Beijing City Changping District Pingxifu High School (北京市昌平区平西府中学)
 Beijing City Changping District Shangyuan High School (北京市昌平区上苑中学)
 Beijing Normal University Changping Affiliated School (北京师范大学昌平附属学校)
 Second High School Attached to Beijing Normal University Weilaikejicheng School (北京师范大学第二附属中学未来科技城学校)
 Capital Normal University Affiliated Huilong Guanyu Xin School (首都师范大学附属回龙观育新学校)
  Changping School (首都师范大学附属中学昌平学校)
 China University of Petroleum Affiliated High School (中国石油大学附属中学)
 China University of Political Science and Law Affiliated School (中国政法大学附属学校)
 North China Electric Power University Affiliated High School (华北电力大学附属中学)
 Tingzizhuang School (亭自庄学校) - Secondary School Campus (中学校区), Center Campus (中心校区), and Tulou Campus (土楼校区)
 Xingshou School (兴寿学校)
 Yandan School (燕丹学校)
 Zhongtan High School (中滩中学)
 Special Child Education School (特殊儿童教育学校)

Primary schools

 Beijing City Changping District No. 4 High School Primary School Division (北京市昌平区第四中学小学部)
  Affiliated Changping School (清华大学附属小学昌平学校)

Private and international schools
Beijing Huijia Private School is in Changping District.
Beijing Royal School
The Korean International School in Beijing was previously located in Changping District.

References

Changping
Schools